Moineau was the former merchantman Spartiate, which the French Navy requisitioned to serve as 16-gun corvette on the Île de France station between 1794 and 1797.

Career 
In May 1794, the French Navy brought Spartiate into naval service as Moineau. She then served in the naval station of Île de France, carrying out missions to Batavia.

In June 1796, the French Directory's executive agents Baco and Burnel, arrived at Mauritius with the naval division under Sercey and set out to abolish slavery, in application of the decree of 16 Pluviose Year II on the abolition of slavery. This alienated the colonists and Governor Malartic; a militia stormed Baco and Burnel's quarters and forcibly put them aboard Moineau.

Malartic then ordered Commander (and capitaine de frégate) Tayeau, the captain of Moineau, to carry Baco and Burnel to Batavia.

Once Moineau was at sea, Baco and Burnel ordered Tayeau to bring them to France. Moineau then sailed for Rochefort. Upon Moineaus arrival, Tayeau was commended for his action.

On the way back to France, Moineau first stopped at Foulepointe, a French factory on the coast of Madagascar to reprovision. Next, near the Cape of Good Hope, Moineau encountered Lady Shore, which was sailing to Bengal on behalf of the British East India Company. Moineau captured Lady Shore on 19 July. After stripping her of much of her cargo, Tayeau let her go on 22 July, permitting her captain to take her into the Cape.

Fate 
Moineau was returned to her original owner in 1797.

Notes, citations, and references

Notes

Citations

References 
 
 

 
 
 Wanquet, Claude (2003) Baco and Burnel's attempt to implement Abolition in the Mascarenes in 1796: Analysis of a Failure and its Consequences, in Marcel Dorigny, The abolitions of slavery, Berghahn Books.
Winfield, Rif & Stephen S Roberts (2015) French Warships in the Age of Sail 1786 - 1861: Design Construction, Careers and Fates. (Seaforth Publishing). 

1790s ships
Corvettes of the French Navy